Sikh Temple Makindu is located about 104 miles (170km) from Nairobi on the main Nairobi to Mombasa Road. It was built in 1926 by the Sikhs who were working on the construction of the Uganda railway line from the coast (Mombasa) inland to Lake Victoria and beyond to Uganda.

Background

Set in the forest off the main road, the complex houses a dining facility which provides free langar 24 hours a day. 

Rooms with beds - several with attached bathrooms - are available for tourists to stay for up to two nights.

History

Although the Sikh Temple Makindu was built in 1926, its roots are believed to have been present way before then. When the Uganda Railway was completed in 1902 at Port Florence (which is now Kisumu, Kenya), Makindu played a prominent role as a service point on the railway's advance from Mombasa. 

Sikhs, Hindus and Muslims would gather together in the evenings and sing the praises of God. They did so under a tree, the spot where the current Gurdwara now stands. It is also believed that the Gurdwara was funded by non-Sikhs along with Sikhs.

In the years before 1926, the Gurdwara was a tin-roof little hut where the Sikhs used to pray everyday, and the Guru Guru Granth Sahib was housed there. But when the Railway moved on from Makindu, the service point went into disuse and became unimportant. Sikh devotees who passed along the Gurdwara would leave offerings of money by dropping it through the locked Gurdwara's window.

Now the Makindu Sikh Temple is the first and the second biggest after Kericho Sikh Temple and the most  famous  in East Africa.

See also
 Gurdwara
 Langar
 Makindu
 Mombasa
 Nairobi

References

External links
 Aerial view via satellite - Google maps

Gurdwaras in Africa
Indian-Kenyan culture
Religious buildings and structures in Kenya